This article lists the presidents of the United States Chess Federation from its foundation in 1939 to present. The presidents were elected by voting members to three-year terms. Now the executive board elects its own officers annually.

List
 1939–1942   George Sturgis
 1943–1948   Elbert Wagner, Jr.
 1948–1951   Paul Geirs
 1951–1954   Harold M. Phillips
 1954–1957   Frank Graves 
 1957–1960   Jerry Spann
 1960–1963   Fred Cramer
 1963–1966   Ed Edmondson
 1966–1969   Marshall Rohland
 1969–1972   Leroy Dubeck
 1972–1975   Frank Skoff
 1975–1978   George Koltanowski
 1978–1981   Gary Sperling
 1981–1984   Tim Redman
 1984–1987   Steven Doyle
 1987–1990   Harold Winston
 1990–1993   Maxim Dlugy
 1993–1996   Denis Barry
 1996–1999   Don Schultz
 1999–2000   Bob Smith 
 2000–2001   Tim Redman
 2001–2003   John McCrary
 2003–2005   Beatriz Marinello
 2005–2008   Bill Goichberg
 2009–2011   Jim Berry
 2011–2015   Ruth Inez Haring
 2015–2017   Gary Walters
 2017–2018   Mike Hoffpauir
 2018–2020   W. Allen Priest
 2020–2022   Mike Hoffpauir
 2022–present Randy Bauer

See also

 United States Chess Federation
 Executive Directors of the United States Chess Federation
 Fédération Internationale des Échecs (FIDE)
 International Correspondence Chess Federation (ICCF)

References

External links
 Official USCF website
 USCF info on the FIDE website

Chess organizations
Chess in the United States
Presidents of the United States Chess Federation